Marie Rollet was a French woman and early settler in Quebec.  Her second husband, Louis Hébert, was apothecary to Samuel Champlain's expeditions to Acadia and Quebec on 1606 and 1610–13.  When she and her three surviving children traveled with her husband to Quebec in 1617, she became the first European woman to settle in Quebec.  Her eldest daughter Anne's marriage to Étienne Jonquet in 1618 was the first recorded in Quebec.  While Anne died in childbirth in 1619, she left many descendants through her other two children.

According to the Dictionary of Canadian Biography, Hébert routinely provided medical treatment to First Nations peoples, and the entire family had friendly ties with First Nations people.

Her husband Louis Hebert died in 1627, and she remarried in 1629.

Quebec was captured and occupied by British privateers in 1627, during the Anglo-French War of (1627–1629).  Although the English returned many of the settlers to France, Rollet and her family, remained.

David Kirke, the leader of the English occupiers, had brought a seven year old enslaved boy from Madagascar.  Kirke sold the boy to Olivier Letardif.  This was the first recorded sale of an African slave in Quebec.  Letardif, in turn, gave the boy to Rollet's daughter Guillemette Couillard.  Rollet and Couillard arranged for the child to have some religious and practical education, and he was baptized Olivier Le Jeune, in 1633.

According to the Dictionary of Canadian Biography after the end of British occupation, in 1632, "her house became the home of indigenous girls given to the Jesuits for training."

References

French emigrants to Canada
1649 deaths
17th century in Quebec